Nahir Oyal (born 17 December 1990), is a Swedish footballer who plays for Arameiska-Syrianska IF.

Career
He played in Allsvenskan and Superettan with Syrianska FC before signing a 4-year pre-contract for Djurgårdens IF in the summer of 2011, transferring for the 2012 season. He was on loan to Syrianska FC and Şanlıurfaspor from Djurgårdens IF. He terminated his contract Djurgårdens IF in 2015.

References

External links
 
 Profile at Eliteprospects
 

1990 births
Living people
Djurgårdens IF Fotboll players
Syrianska FC players
Allsvenskan players
Superettan players
Assyrian footballers
Swedish footballers
Swedish people of Assyrian/Syriac descent
Swedish people of Turkish descent
Turkish people of Assyrian descent
Association football forwards
People from Södertälje
Sportspeople from Stockholm County